Documento Nacional de Identidad or DNI (which means National Identity Document) is the main identity document for Argentine citizens, as well as temporary or permanent resident aliens (DNI Extranjero). It is issued at a person's birth, and must be updated at 8 and 14 years of age, and thereafter every 15 years. It takes the form of a card (DNI tarjeta), and is required for voting, payments, military service inscriptions and formalities. They are issued by the National Registry of Persons (RENAPER).

The front side of the card states, in both English and Spanish, the name, sex, nationality, specimen issue, date of birth, date of issue, date of expiry, and transaction number along with the DNI number, portrait, and signature of the card's bearer. The back side of the card shows the address of the card's bearer along with their right thumbprint. The front side of the card also shows a PDF417 barcode while the back shows machine-readable information. The unique DNI number is semi-perforated through the front-right side of the card.

The DNI is a valid international travel document to enter the member countries of Mercosur (Brazil, Paraguay, Uruguay and Venezuela) and countries associated to the bloc (Bolivia, Chile, Colombia, Ecuador and Peru).

History
Before the introduction of the DNI in 1968, women had a Libreta cívica ("civic booklet"); men a Libreta de enrolamiento ("(military) enrollment booklet"). For many years, the DNI was issued as a small green booklet (called libreta). In 2009, the DNI was revamped and digitalized; and booklets (now blue) were issued along with an identity card simultaneously. Since 2012, DNIs are issued only in card format. The new DNI card is required to obtain the new biometric Argentine passport. Foreigners can get it at “RadEx” system but "extranjero" (foreigner) is printed on the back side. Argentines can get a certificado de matrícula, which is only for citizens, in consulates. 

In 2020, the DNI card was restyled to show the new bicontinental official map of Argentina. 

On 20 July 2021, President Alberto Fernández signed a decree (Decreto 476/2021) mandating the RENAPER to allow a third gender option on all DNI cards and passports, marked as an "X". The measure applies to non-citizen permanent residents who possess Argentine identity cards as well. In compliance with the 2012 Gender Identity Law, this made Argentina the first country in South America to legally recognize non-binary gender on all official documentation, freely and upon the person's request.

Gallery

See also
 Argentine nationality law
 Visa requirements for Argentine citizens
 Visa policy of Argentina

References

Government of Argentina
Argentina
Law of Argentina